The Bestune T55 is a compact CUV produced by the FAW Group under the brand name Bestune. It was available in China starting from 2021.

Overview

It costs 150,000 yuan. It comes in Regular and Sports versions. The vehicle has dimensions of 4437 mm/1850 mm/1625 mm, and a wheelbase of 1625 mm.

See Also
Bestune T99
Bestune T77
Bestune T33

References

Cars of China
Cars introduced in 2021
Front-wheel-drive vehicles
Compact sport utility vehicles
Crossover sport utility vehicles